Kastamonu Ethnography Museum is a museum in Kastamonu, Turkey

Location
The museum is in a historic building named Liva Paşa Konağı ("The mansion of Liva Pasha") .

History
The 3-storey mansion was built in 1887 by an Ottoman mir-liva ("Brigadier general") Sadık Pasha.  In 1978 it was bought by the Ministry of Culture. In 1997 it was opened as an ethnography museum.

Exhibit
In the ground floor is reserved for the library specialized on Kastamonu and the picture gallery of Kastamonu. In the upper floor various ethnographic items are exhibited. Most important of these is the portal of Mahmut Bey Mosque, a mosque built in Kasaba  village in 1366  which is a masterpiece of art. The uppermost floor reflects the Kastamonu urban life by means of mannequins.

References

Buildings and structures in Kastamonu Province
Museums established in 1997
Ethnographic museums in Turkey
Tourist attractions in Kastamonu Province